Salvador of Horta  (December 152018 March 1567) was a Spanish Franciscan lay brother from the region of Catalonia in Spain, who was celebrated as a miracle worker during his lifetime. He is honored as a saint by the Catholic Church.

Life

Veneration
At the request of King Philip, Salvador was allowed to be venerated as "Blessed" on 5 February 1606 by Pope Paul V, which was confirmed on 29 January 1711 by Pope Clement XI. He was canonized on 17 April 1938 by Pope Pius XI. His feast day is generally celebrated on 18 March, the anniversary of his death; it is observed, however, by the Friars Minor on 17 April, the anniversary of his canonization.

His remains were originally interred at the Church of St. Mary of Jesus attached to the friary where he died. In 1606 it had been decided to open his grave to provide his heart as a relic for the Franciscan community in Silke, near Sassari. When it was opened, his body was found to be still intact. Thus, when the Church of St. Mary of Jesus was demolished in 1718, his remains were interred first at another church of the Order in the city, then finally, in 1758, they were entombed in a glass coffin under the main altar of the Church of St. Rosalie in the city. This remains his shrine, where his remains can be venerated.

Veneration of Salvador spread throughout his native Catalunya and also in Calabria, long under Spanish rule.

References

External links
Den Katolske Kirke Den hellige Salvator av Orta 

1567 deaths
1520 births
People from Santa Coloma de Farners
Spanish Friars Minor
Canonized Roman Catholic religious brothers
Spanish Roman Catholic saints
Catalan Roman Catholic saints
Franciscan saints
16th-century Christian saints
Miracle workers
Incorrupt saints